Chondracanthus merluccii is a species of copepod in the family Chondracanthidae. It is a host-specific ectoparasite of the European hake (Merluccius merluccius). It was first described in 1802 by the Danish zoologist Hans Severin Holten who named it Lernaea merluccii.

Ecology
Both adult females and adult males cling onto the lining of the floor of the mouth and onto the gills of the host fish.

References 

Poecilostomatoida
Parasitic crustaceans
Ectoparasites
Animal parasites of fish
Crustaceans described in 1802